Curtonotum is a genus of flies in the family Curtonotidae. There are more than 50 described species in Curtonotum.

Species
These 58 species belong to the genus Curtonotum:

 Curtonotum amurensis Ozerov, 2007
 Curtonotum angolense Tsacas, 1977
 Curtonotum angustipennis (Meijere, 1911)
 Curtonotum anus (Meigen, 1830)
 Curtonotum apicale Hendel, 1913
 Curtonotum arenatum (Osten Sacken, 1882)
 Curtonotum balachowski Tsacas, 1974
 Curtonotum bathmedum Hendel, 1913
 Curtonotum boeny Tsacas, 1974
 Curtonotum brevicorne (Duda, 1939)
 Curtonotum campsiphallum Tsacas, 1977
 Curtonotum ceylonense Delfinado, 1969
 Curtonotum coriaceum (Hendel, 1932)
 Curtonotum curtispinum Klymko & Marshall
 Curtonotum cuthbertsoni Duda, 1935
 Curtonotum decumanum Bezzi, 1914
 Curtonotum desperatum Klymko & Marshall
 Curtonotum flavisetum Klymko & Marshall
 Curtonotum fumipenne Hendel, 1913
 Curtonotum fuscipenne (Macquart, 1843)
 Curtonotum gibbum (Fabricius, 1805)
 Curtonotum helvum (Loew, 1862) (curtonotid fly)
 Curtonotum hendeli Malloch, 1930
 Curtonotum hendelianum (Enderlein, 1917)
 Curtonotum herrero Tsacas, 1977
 Curtonotum hunkingi Klymko & Marshall
 Curtonotum impunctatum Hendel, 1913
 Curtonotum keiseri Tsacas, 1974
 Curtonotum maai Delfinado, 1969
 Curtonotum maculiventre (Enderlein, 1917)
 Curtonotum magnum Malloch, 1930
 Curtonotum maritimum Ozerov, 2007
 Curtonotum murinum Hendel, 1913
 Curtonotum neoangustipenne Dwivedi & Gupta, 1979
 Curtonotum nigripalpe Hendel, 1936
 Curtonotum pantherinum (Walker, 1849)
 Curtonotum papillatum Klymko & Marshall
 Curtonotum pauliani Tsacas, 1974
 Curtonotum platyphallum Tsacas, 1977
 Curtonotum punctithorax Fischer, 1933
 Curtonotum quinquevittatum Curran, 1933
 Curtonotum saheliense Tsacas, 1977
 Curtonotum sakalava Tsacas, 1974
 Curtonotum salinum Curran, 1934
 Curtonotum sao Tsacas, 1977
 Curtonotum scambum Klymko & Marshall
 Curtonotum shatalkini Ozerov, 2007
 Curtonotum simile Tsacas, 1977
 Curtonotum simplex Schiner, 1868
 Curtonotum sternithrix Tsacas, 1974
 Curtonotum striatifrons Malloch, 1930
 Curtonotum stuckenbergi Tsacas, 1974
 Curtonotum taeniatum Hendel, 1913
 Curtonotum tigrinum Seguy, 1933
 Curtonotum trypetipenne Hendel, 1913
 Curtonotum tumidum Enderlein, 1917
 Curtonotum vulpinum Hendel, 1913
 † Curtonotum electrodominicum Grimaldi & Kirk-Spriggs, 2012

References

Further reading

External links

 

Ephydroidea genera
Articles created by Qbugbot